Fukuoka J. Anclas is a Japanese women's football club from Fukuoka. Founded in 1986, it has played in the Nadeshiko League since 2010.

Squad

Current squad
As of 5 April 2018

Results

Transition of team name
 Fukuoka Jogakuin FC: 1986–1999
 Fukuoka Jogakuin FC Anclas: 2000–2005
 Fukuoka J. Anclas: 2006–present

References

External links
 Fukuoka J. Anclas official site
 Japanese Club Teams

Women's football clubs in Japan
Association football clubs established in 1986
1986 establishments in Japan
Sports teams in Fukuoka Prefecture